is a multi-purpose stadium in Tendo, Yamagata, Japan. It is currently used mostly for football matches. It serves as a home ground of Montedio Yamagata. The stadium holds 21,292 people and was built in 1991.

References 

Yamagata Sports Park website

External links

山形県総合運動公園

Location map

Football venues in Japan
Rugby union stadiums in Japan
Athletics (track and field) venues in Japan
Multi-purpose stadiums in Japan
Sports venues in Yamagata Prefecture
Montedio Yamagata
Tendō, Yamagata
Sports venues completed in 1991
1991 establishments in Japan